"Iron" is a song by Nicky Romero and Calvin Harris. The song was released as a single, via Beatport. It became the second single to be released through Romero's label Protocol Recordings (after "WTF!?" with ZROQ), and the first single from the label to reach number-one on Beatport. A shortened version of the song was later included on Harris' third studio album, 18 Months (2012).

Composition
The majority of the song has an upbeat electro house style until vocals from Harris come in. When the vocals do come in, the background tune is just a piano being played until Calvin Harris sings "Our hearts will never be the same again". After this happens, the song becomes upbeat again, but more aggressive.

Track listing

Credits and personnel
 Nicky Romero – production, arrangement, all instruments
 Calvin Harris – production, arrangement, vocals

Release history

References

External links
 

2012 singles
2012 songs
Nicky Romero songs
Calvin Harris songs
Songs written by Calvin Harris
Songs written by Nicky Romero